Albert Groves may refer to:
 Albert Groves (footballer, born 1886), Welsh footballer and manager
 Albert Groves (footballer, born 1883), English footballer
 Albert B. Groves, American architect